The Shark is a lost 1920 American silent film produced and distributed by Fox Film Corporation. It was directed by Dell Henderson and starred George Walsh.

Cast
George Walsh as Shark Rawley
Robert Broderick as Rodman Selby
William Nally as Sanchez
James T. Mack as Hump Logan
Henry Pemberton as Juan Najera
Marie Pagano as Carlotta
Mary Hall as Doris Selby

Plot
The story revolves around Shark Rawley, a sailor on a tramp steamer who saves a woman by the name of Doris Hall from the crew of the ship and its captain Sanchez. The film climaxes with the ship burning when a fire breaks out. Rawley and Hall escape and while waiting for the rescue boat they fall in love with each other.

See also
List of Fox Film films
1937 Fox vault fire

References

External links

allmovie/synopsis; The Shark

1920 films
American silent feature films
Fox Film films
Lost American films
1920 drama films
Silent American drama films
American black-and-white films
1920 lost films
Lost drama films
Films directed by Dell Henderson
1920s American films